Wild Heart(s) or Wildheart(s) or variants may refer to:

Film and television
 The Wild Heart (film), a 1952 recut version of the 1950 British film Gone to Earth
 Wild Hearts (film), a 2006 American television film

Literature
 Wildheart (comics), or Wild Child, a Marvel Comics character
Wildheart, a 2002 picture book by Isobelle Carmody
The Wild Heart, a 2005 novel by Anne Herries
Wild Hearts, a novel by Cherie Bennett
Wild Hearts, a 1985 novel by Virginia Henley

Music

Performers
 WildHeart, an American rock band
 The Wildhearts, an English rock band
 C. J. Wildheart (born 1967), English musician, cofounder of the Wildhearts
 Ginger Wildheart (born 1964), English musician, cofounder of the Wildhearts

Albums
 Wild Heart (Mindi Abair album) or the title song, 2014
 Wild Heart (Urban Rescue album) or the title song, 2016
 Wild Heart (EP), by Urban Rescue, 2016
 Wild Heart, by Samantha Fish, 2015
 Wild Heart, by Willie & Lobo, 1999
 The Wild Heart (album) or the title song (see below), by Stevie Nicks, 1983
 Wildheart (album), by Miguel, 2015
 The Wildhearts (album), by the Wildhearts, 2007

Songs
 "Wild Heart" (Stevie Nicks song), 1983
 "Wild Heart" (The Vamps song), 2014
 "Wild Heart", by Ashley Roberts from Butterfly Effect, 2014
 "Wild Heart", by Bleachers from Strange Desire, 2014
 "Wild Heart", by Doro Pesch from Fight, 2002
 "Wild Heart", by Luba from All or Nothing, 1989
 "Wild Heart", by Mumford & Sons from Delta, 2018
 "Wild Heart", by Sabi, 2011
 "Wild Heart", by Wade Ray, 1957
 "Wild Hearts" (song), a 2021 song by Keith Urban
 "Wild Hearts", by Roy Orbison, 1985
 "Wildheart", by Adrian Lux, 2012
 "Wildheart", by Winterborn, 2006

Other uses
 Wildheart Animal Sanctuary, Isle of Wight, England
 Wild Hearts (video game), a video game developed by Omega Force
 WildHeart, a Revlon perfume for which Trisha Yearwood was a spokesperson

See also
Corazón salvaje (disambiguation)
Vildhjarta, a Swedish metal band
Wild at Heart (disambiguation)